Sam Yaek Bang Yai station is a Bangkok MRT station on the  Purple Line. The station is located on Rattanathibet Road in Nonthaburi Province.

External links

Sam Yaek Bang Yai station

MRT (Bangkok) stations
Railway stations opened in 2016